Donia Hamed is an Egyptian model. She is crowned Miss Egypt Universe in 2010. Her other career is in the stock market. She competed at Miss Universe 2010.

References

Miss Egypt winners
Egyptian female models
Egyptian beauty pageant winners
Living people
Year of birth missing (living people)
Miss Universe 2010 contestants
Miss World 2011 delegates